Burmese Ghouls (MLBB) (often abbreviated as BG) was a professional MLBB team from Myanmar formerly operating under Burmese Ghouls Esports. The team disbanded on 3 July 2021 due to Chinese games boycotts after the 2021 Myanmar coup d'état. They were one of the best MLBB teams in Myanmar. On January 23, 2021, they won the first runner-up award at the M2 World Championship.

History

The Burmese Ghouls was founded with the name Team Accident 2 in 2016 by ICE ICE and PVNDV with the members of Kid, Ace, and Fox. Their first game contest was Huawei Nova Championship 2017. Before the contest, Kid and Fox left and Ardam and Blank joined the team as new members and competed in the Zurich competition. They competed under the name Ghouls. Not long after, they changed their team name to Burmese Ghouls. Burmese Ghouls was the team chosen to represent Myanmar at the MSC 2018 in Singapore, but unfortunately, they only advanced to the group stage. Then, the team won the Huawei Nova Championship 2018.

During MPL Season 1, CG-0 joined as a stand-in. After competing in MPL Myanmar Season 1, Blank left the team and Ruby DD joined. After winning 1st runner up in MPL Season 2, Ardam left and Maybe joined the team. Then the team represented Myanmar at the MSC 2019 together with Team Resolution (RSO, currently known as Yangon Galacticos YG) but unplaced, and Kid returns to the team.

The team started to operate officially under Burmese Ghouls Esports as of 2018. The team came in fourth place at the $250,000 M1-World Championship in Malaysia in 2019. After competing in MPL Season 3, PVNDV became a coach and took a rest from the player life. During MPL Season 4, DEE joined the team. Together with the new players, BG won the MPL Season 3 and 4 (Mobile Legends Professional League, Myanmar), and the team was invited to represent Myanmar in the M1 World Championship and finished as third runner-up. In the M2 World Championship, they were first runner-up. They were the first team in the Myanmar e-sport world to reach the finals of the World Championship.

Following the 2021 Myanmar coup d'état, Burmese Ghouls have disbanded as of July 3, 2021 with only the leader ICE ICE remaining in BG even though he will no longer play Mobile Legends: Bang Bang because of a domestic boycott of Chinese games in Myanmar.

Tournaments

MPL seasons

Local tournaments

International tournaments

References

External links 
 

Esports teams established in 2016
Mobile Legends: Bang Bang teams